Koog may refer to:

 Koog a form of polder on the coastline of Germany
 Koog aan de Zaan, a town in Holland